The 1983–84 Romanian Hockey League season was the 54th season of the Romanian Hockey League. Six teams participated in the league, and Steaua Bucuresti won the championship.

Regular season

Promotion/Relegation
Dunarea Galati - Imasa Sfantu Gheorghe 4-0, 6-3

External links
hochei.net

Romania
Romanian Hockey League seasons
Rom